Lukáš Klíma (born 19 February 1991) is a Czech curler.

Klíma skipped the Czech junior team at two World Junior Curling Championships. At the 2011 World Junior Curling Championships he led teammates Marek Cernovsky, Samuel Mokris and Karel Klima to a 9th-place finish (2-8 record).  At the 2012 World Junior Curling Championships, he led Cernovsky, Jan Zelingr and Mokris to an 8th-place finish (2-7 record). The highlight of his junior career came at the 2011 Winter Universiade. There, he led his team of Jiri Candra, Tomáš Paul and David Jirounek to a bronze medal. After posting a 6-3 round robin record, the team beat Canada in a tie breaker, then lost to Korea in the semifinal, before beating Great Britain to claim the bronze. Klíma skipped the Czech Republic again at the 2013 Winter Universiade, but his team had less success, finishing 7th with a 3-6 record. Klíma attended Charles University in Prague. Also during his junior career, Klíma played in the 2012 World Mixed Doubles Curling Championship. Klíma and partner Petra Vinsova finished in 16th.

After juniors, Klíma joined the Jiří Snítil rink at third position. The team played at the 2014 European Curling Championships, finishing 5th.

References

External links

1991 births
Living people
Czech male curlers
Universiade medalists in curling
Universiade bronze medalists for the Czech Republic
Competitors at the 2011 Winter Universiade
21st-century Czech people
Competitors at the 2017 Winter Universiade
Charles University alumni